Brian L. Burgess (born January, 1951) is a retired Associate Justice of the Vermont Supreme Court.  He served on the court from 2005 2013.

Biography
Brian Louis Burgess was born in Washington, DC.  He received his Bachelor of Arts degree from the College of the Holy Cross in 1973 and his Juris Doctor from the Villanova University School of Law in 1976. He was admitted to the bar, and practiced law with the firm of Timothy J. O'Connor Jr. from 1976 to 1978.  He was staff attorney for Vermont's Department of Social Welfare in 1978 and state Assistant Attorney General for fiscal recoveries and Medicaid fraud prosecutions from 1978 to 1983.

He was the state's Deputy Commissioner and then Commissioner of Labor and Industry from 1983 to 1985.  From 1985 to 1992, Burgess served as Vermont's Deputy Attorney General for white-collar and environmental criminal prosecutions.  In 1992, he was appointed a judge of the Vermont District Court, and in 2004 the state Supreme Court designated him as Chief Trial Judge, with responsibility for monitoring court operations and controlling work assignments for Vermont's state courts.

In 2005, Burgess was nominated to serve as an associate justice on the Vermont Supreme Court.  He remained on the bench until retiring in 2013.  According to news accounts at the time of his elevation to the Supreme Court, Burgess was identified with the Republican Party.

Family
Burgess is the son of Louis Burgess and Barbara (Babcock) Burgess.

In 1977, Burgess married Maureen Elizabeth O’Connor of Adams, Massachusetts.

See also
Vermont vs Hunt (1982)

References

External links
Brian Burgess at Judgepedia

1951 births
Living people
College of the Holy Cross alumni
Villanova University School of Law alumni
Vermont Republicans
Vermont lawyers
Justices of the Vermont Supreme Court